The Los Angeles Press Club is an American journalism organization founded in 1913.  It honors journalists through its annual National Arts and Entertainment Journalism Awards and SoCal Journalism Awards.

The Board of Directors includes the organization's president, Robert Kovacik of KNBC, vice president, Cher Calvin of KTLA and treasurer Chris Palmeri of Bloomberg. The executive director is Swedish-born journalist Diana Ljungaeus.

Dean of the USC Annenberg School of Journalism, Willow Bay, was honored with the organization's Joseph M. Quinn Award in 2015.

References

External links
 
 

American journalism organizations